In the history of championships in major professional sports leagues in the United States and Canada (which include the NFL, MLB, NBA, and NHL), a city/metropolitan area has been home to multiple championships in a season 18 times, most recently in 2020 when the Tampa Bay Lightning won the 2020 Stanley Cup and Tampa Bay Buccaneers won Super Bowl LV. 2020 was also the first season where two different cities won multiple championships, with the Los Angeles Lakers winning the 2020 NBA Finals and the Los Angeles Dodgers winning the 2020 World Series. New York City is the only city to win multiple titles in back-to-back seasons, doing so in 1926–1927 and 1927–1928. No city has ever won more than two championships in the four major sports in the same season. 

A city has been home to multiple championships in a calendar year 18 times as well. Even though this has happened the same number of times as a city winning multiple championships in one season, this is a coincidence as a city can win two titles in a season without those titles being in the same calendar year (for example, the New York Jets and New York Mets both won titles in the 1969 calendar year, but the Jets Super Bowl III win was for the 1968 season; likewise the Baltimore Colts and Baltimore Orioles both won championships in the 1970 season, but the Colts Super Bowl V win came in 1971). This most recently happened in 2021 when the Tampa Bay Buccaneers won Super Bowl LV and Tampa Bay Lightning won the 2021 Stanley Cup, their second in a row. Like with single season championships, New York City is the only city to win multiple titles in back-to-back calendar years, doing so in 1927 and 1928. Also like with single season championships, no city has won more than two titles in a single calendar year. 

Philadelphia is the only city to have all four major sports teams (MLB's Phillies, NBA's 76ers, NFL's Eagles, and NHL's Flyers) play in their respective championship game or series in the same season (1980), though only one of the four (Phillies) actually won the championship. The Tampa Bay area, which does not have an NBA team, had all three of its major sports teams (MLB's Rays, NFL's Buccaneers, and NHL's Lightning) play in their respective championships in the 2020 season, with the Lightning and Buccaneers winning the championships.

Definitions
Because some of the present-day "big four" North American sports leagues have merged with other leagues and their championships in the past, this article considers the following to be major sports championships:
Major League Baseball: 
World Series championship, 1903–present
National Basketball Association: 
NBA championship, 1950–present
National Hockey League: 
Stanley Cup championship, 1914–present
National Football League:
Super Bowl championship, 1966–present
NFL championship, 1920–1965 
AFL championship, 1960–1965
AAFC championship, 1946–1949

Teams which are based in the same metropolitan area are considered together for this article even if they are not based in the same city. For example, teams representing Oakland, California are grouped with other teams based in the San Francisco Bay Area and teams playing in or representing New Jersey are grouped with other teams based in the New York City metropolitan area.

While the Super Bowl game is held in February (January prior to 2002), a Super Bowl championship is considered to be the championship for the year in which the regular season was played; for example, Super Bowl LIII, played on February 3, 2019, was the championship game for the 2018 NFL season and is thus considered a 2018 championship. All other championships including pre-Super Bowl football championships are considered to have been won the year in which the championship was awarded.

Multiple championships in a season

Multiple championships in a calendar year

Multiple championships involving other professional teams

Notes

See also
Major professional sports leagues in the United States and Canada
List of U.S. cities by number of professional sports championships
U.S. cities with teams from four major league sports
Treble (association football)

Footnotes

References 

Sports in the United States by populated place